Mikell Herman Williams (born November 22, 1953) is a former American football cornerback in the National Football League. He was drafted by the San Diego Chargers 22nd overall in the 1975 NFL Draft. Born in New Orleans, he played college football at Louisiana State. Williams also played for the Los Angeles Rams in his final season.

References

1953 births
Living people
Players of American football from New Orleans
American football cornerbacks
LSU Tigers football players
San Diego Chargers players
Los Angeles Rams players